Saint-Aubin-des-Hayes is a former commune in the Eure department in Normandy in northern France. On 1 January 2016, it was merged into the new commune of Mesnil-en-Ouche.

Population
{{Historical populations
|align=left|
1962| 115|
1968| 117|
1975| 137|
1982| 118|
1990| 103|
1999| 112|
2008| 133|
{{
{Remove left}

See also
Communes of the Eure department

References

Former communes of Eure